RIVA was a series of Nvidia graphics processing units. The main products of the series were:

 RIVA 128
 RIVA TNT
 RIVA TNT2

See also 
 Riva (disambiguation)